Council Hill is an unincorporated community in Jo Daviess County, Illinois, United States. Council Hill is a little over 6 miles northeast of the county seat of Galena.

The community was named from a tradition that Native American tribal councils were held near the town site.

References

Unincorporated communities in Jo Daviess County, Illinois
Unincorporated communities in Illinois